The Alexander Technological Educational Institute of Thessaloniki, was a higher education public institute, part of the Greek tertiary education system, specialized on science. As of 2017, there was a student population of 30,000 registered students with more than 430 faculty members and 200 administrative staff. In 2019, the Alexander Technological Educational Institute of Thessaloniki merged with the Technological Educational Institute of Central Macedonia, the Technological Educational Institute of Eastern Macedonia and Thrace, and the International Hellenic University in order to form a new University, with the name of the latter.

History

The Alexander Technological Educational Institute of Thessaloniki was founded in 1970 and started its operation in February 1974 as a Center for Higher Education. In 1983 Technological Educational Institutions were established as part of tertiary education in Greece.

The Department of Clothing Design and Production was added in the academic year 1999-2000 as an annex of the institute in Kilkis and in the academic year 2000-2001 the Department of Fisheries Technology - Aquaculture started operating, also as an annex of the A.T.E.I.TH., based in New Moudania Halkidiki. In addition, since the spring of 1998, two optional program studies have become available for admitting students outside the traditional way of examinations.

During 2019, the Alexander Technological Educational Institute of Thessaloniki was merged with the International University of Greece, and the Technological Educational Institutions of Central and Eastern Macedonia, Thrace to form the new International Hellenic University (www.ihu.gr).

Schools and departments
The university includes four Schools, consisting of eighteen Departments.

Campus
The institute has three campuses. The main campus is located 15 km outside the city of Thessaloniki in Sindos, the second campus is in the nearby city of Kilkis and the last campus is in Nea Moudania.

The institute's own facilities located at the 15th km of national road Thessaloniki - Athens, near the entrance of Sindos. Spread over an area of 1,600 acres, most of which approximately 900 acres, occupied the farm, with greenhouse crops, stables, poultry farm, plant personnel, training rooms and office service farm. The total building area reaches 35,000 m², which hosts the five schools currently operating in the institute. In the same area is, finally, one of the two homes available to the institute for the accommodation of students.

Postgraduate education 
The institution offers several postgraduate programmes:

M.Sc. in Tourism Management and Business Administration, M.B.A in Business Administration, M.Sc. in Money Management, Logistics and Informational Systems, M.Sc. in Web Intelligence, M.Sc. in Management and Organization of Educational Units, M.Sc. in Nutrition and Dietology, M.Sc. in Pediatrics Physiotherapy, M.Sc. in Innonative Systems of Sustainable Agricultural Production, M.Sc. in Quality Management and Organization of Production Systems in the Food Industry, M.Sc. in Neuromusculoskeletal Physiotherapy, M.Sc. in Bio-Medicinal Sciences in Diagnosis and Treatment of Patients.

Academic evaluation
In 2016 the external evaluation committee gave the Alexander Technological Educational Institute of Thessaloniki a Positive evaluation.

All departments have published their internal evaluation reports. An external evaluation was conducted in 2008-2014 by the Hellenic Quality Assurance and Accreditation Agency (HQA).

See also
 Open access in Greece

References

External links 
 ATEI of Thessaloniki Official Website 
 ATEI of Thessaloniki Internal Quality Assurance Unit 
 Hellenic Quality Assurance and Accreditation Agency (HQAA) 
 Department of Food Technology, HQAA Final Report, 2008 
 Department of Animal Production, HQAA Final Report, 2010 
 Department of Crop Production, HQAA Final Report, 2010 
 Department of Computer Engineering, HQAA Final Report, 2010 
 Department of Fisheries and Aquaculture Technology, HQAA Final Report, 2011 
 Department of Librarianship and Information Systems, HQAA Final Report, 2011 
 Department of Midwifery, HQAA Final Report, 2011 }
 Department of Nursing, HQAA Final Report, 2012 
 Department of Medical Laboratories Studies, HQAA Final Report, 2012 
 Department of Automation Engineering, HQAA Final Report, 2013 
 Department of Electronics Engineering, HQAA Final Report, 2013 
 Department of Automotive Engineering, HQAA Final Report, 2013 
 Department of Physiotherapy, HQAA Final Report, 2014 
 Department of Aesthetics and Cosmetology, HQAA Final Report, 2014 
 Department of Early Childhood Care and Education, HQAA Final Report, 2014 
 Department of Nutrition and Dietetics, HQAA Final Report, 2014 
 "ATHENA" Plan for Higher Education 
TEI of Thessaloniki Library 
 TEI of Thessaloniki NOC Office (Information Technology and Communications Office) 
 TEI of Thessaloniki ERASMUS Office 
 TEI of Thessaloniki Virtual Tour 
 TEI of Thessaloniki DASTA Office (Career Office & Innovation Unit) 
 TEI of Thessaloniki Career Office) 
 TEI of Thessaloniki Special Account for Funds and Research  
 TEI of Thessaloniki Internal Quality Assurance Unit  
 Greek Research & Technology Network (GRNET) 
 okeanos (GRNET's cloud service) 

Educational institutions established in 1970
Education in Thessaloniki
Technological educational institutions in Greece
1970 establishments in Greece